Otostigmus is a genus of centipedes in the family Scolopendridae. It was first described by Swedish naturalist Carl Oscar von Porat in 1876.  The genus as a whole comprises around 120 species, found primarily in the Neotropics.

Species
Selected species:
 Otostigmus astenus (Köhlrausch, 1878)
 Otostigmus ateles Chamberlin, 1920
 Otostigmus ceylanicus Attems, 1909
 Otostigmus pococki Kraepelin, 1903
 Otostigmus politus Karsch, 1881
 Otostigmus scaber Porat, 1876
 Otostigmus tuberculatus (Köhlrausch, 1878)

References

 

 
 
Centipede genera
Taxa named by Carl Oscar von Porat